James Harold Smith (6 December 1930 – 7 January 2022) was an English professional footballer who played as a winger for Shildon, Chelsea and Leyton Orient.

At the time of his death on 7 January 2022, aged 91, he was Chelsea's oldest surviving player, succeeded by Len Casey.

References

1930 births
2022 deaths
English footballers
Footballers from Sheffield
Association football wingers
Shildon A.F.C. players
Chelsea F.C. players
Leyton Orient F.C. players
English Football League players